This is a list of all seasons played by FK Vardar in national and European football, from 1947 (the year the club was officially founded) to the most recent completed season.

Vardar is the most popular and renowned Macedonian football club both domestically and abroad, having won 10 national championships and 5 national cups.

All-Time Yugoslav First League

All-Time Macedonian First League

Seasons

SFR Yugoslavia (1947–1992)

Macedonia (1992–present)

Notes
 Between the 1988–89 and 1991–92 seasons drawn games went to penalties with only the shootout winners gaining the point. Figures in brackets in the drawn games column represent points won in such shootouts.
 The 1952 Yugoslav First League was shortened and completed over a period of three and a half months, beginning on 2 March and ending on 22 June. The reason for the changes was a desire to start the next season in the fall of 1952, thus implementing the fall–spring format that had become a norm all across Europe by this time. The clubs were initially divided into two groups of six teams each, where everyone within a given group played each other twice (home and away). The statistics for the 1952 season thus show season totals and not just the final standings in the second stage group.
 Vardar was initially relegated, but was decided that would be allowed to remain in the top-flight Yugoslav First League the following season due to the devastating earthquake that hit Skopje in July 1963. The thinking on the part of Yugoslav politicians was that having a team in the top-tier league would be a boost to the morale of inhabitants of Skopje.
 Due to the match-fixing scandal in the 1985–86 season, ten clubs had started the 1986–87 Yugoslav First League season with a deduction of 6 points. Vardar, who had not been deducted any points, won the title and participated in the 1987–88 European Cup. After post-season legal proceedings the situation was resolved in July 1987 with a court ruling which nullified the deductions and which meant that the title was given back to Partizan and that Vardar finished the season in fifth place.
 Vardar was initially relegated, but was stayed in the league because of fusion with Miravci.
 The season was abandoned due to COVID-19 pandemic in North Macedonia. Vardar were declared the champions but not given the licence for the European competitions for the 2020–21 season.

References

External links

Official website 

Seasons
 
Vardar
Vardar Seasons